The 1933 Glasgow Corporation elections were held on 7 November 1933. The results were devastating for the Moderates, who lost control of the Corporation to Labour for the first time, despite socialist candidates making gains in Glasgow at successive general elections. Labour’s victory came as a surprise, even to the party itself, which had already begun blaming its anticipated defeat on vote-splitting caused by the presence of the ILP & the Communists. Labour's dominance of the Corporation would continue, nearly unbroken, to the present day.

Despite winning a combined share of  52.5% of the vote, compared to the Labour/ILP share of 42.8%, the FPTP nature of the ward voting system meant that the split in the Moderate vote allowed Labour to make strong gains at the Moderates expense. Radcliffe acknowledged and welcomed the role he had played in causing the downfall of the Moderate led Corporation, claiming that "if the Socialists have a majority in Glasgow Town Council, they have the Scottish Protestant League to thank for it."

A split between Labour and the Independent Labour Party had ensued a year prior, although Patrick Dollan; a Glaswegian socialist of Irish descent, was able to keep the bulk of the Glasgweian-based ILP on-side. Despite strong support for Labour amongst Glaswegians of Catholic-Irish origin, only 6 out of Glasgow's 116 Councillors following the election were Catholic.

The Moderates were not to bounce back in the following years election either however, and the combined Moderates/SPL share of the vote fell to 46.4%, whilst the Labour/ILP share rose to 51%. Even after several years, when the SPL had faded from the political picture, the Moderate vote did not rebound to its pre-split height, with many SPL voters in turn moving to Labour.

The election was not only a disappointment for Glasgow's right wing parties, but also for its far-left. The Communist party had fielded 15 candidates; who in fact performed moderately well in several working class wards, notably Cowlairs, Springburn, and Gorbals. Despite this however the party failed to gain a single seat, and ultimately won only 10,484 votes; or 3.4% of the total 311,000 votes cast.

Election result

Wards

Anderston

Camphill

Calton

Cathcart

Cowcaddens

Cowlairs

Dalmarnock

Dennistoun

Fairfield

Gorbals

Govan

References

1933 Scottish local elections
1933
1930s in Glasgow